State Route 99 (SR 99) is a long east–west highway in Middle Tennessee. The route travels through large sections of rural areas and for most of the length is a secondary highway. The route begins near Waynesboro and ends in Bradyville after logging  and passing through six counties.

Route description

Wayne County

SR 99 begins as a secondary highway in Wayne County in Waynesboro at an intersection with US 64/SR 15 just east of downtown along a former alignment of US 64. The highway then passes by several homes and businesses before turning north onto Natural Bridge Road, where it leaves Old Hwy. 64 and Waynesboro. SR 99 goes through some rural areas before becoming very curvy as it passes through Ashland and begins paralleling the Buffalo River, shortly before crossing into Lewis County.

Lewis County

SR 99 continues to wind and curve its way through the countryside before making a sharp left turn onto Seiber Ridge Road, where it becomes Allens Creek Road, shortly before crossing the creek of the same name. The highway then makes a sharp right turn onto Buffalo Road, and continues to wind its way across the countryside and eventually crosses the Buffalo River, before continuing northeast and entering Hohenwald, where it comes to an intersection and becomes concurrent with SR 20. They go north past several businesses before turning west and coming to an intersection and becoming concurrent with SR 48. They then pass through some neighborhoods before entering downtown and coming to an intersection with  US 412, where SR 48 continues north, while SR 20 turns west to become concurrent with US 412 and SR 99 turns east to do the same, becoming unsigned and a primary highway. US 412/SR 99 go east as a 4-lane undivided highway to leave downtown and continue east through a major business district before leaving Hohenwald and entering wooded areas, where it widens to a divided highway. The highway continues northeast through wooded areas before entering farmland, shortly before downgrading to an undivided highway, entering Gordonsburg, and having an interchange with the Natchez Trace Parkway. US 412/SR 99 then narrow to 2-lanes and continue through farmland before crossing into Maury County.

Maury County

US 412/SR 99 continue east through farmland and pass through the community of Hampshire, where it has an intersection with SR 166. The highway continues east through farmland before entering the city of Columbia, where SR 99 separates from US 412 at an interchange with US 43/SR 6, where US 412 follows that highway while SR 99 continues into town concurrent with US 412 Bus. They go east along Hampshire Pike to an intersection and become concurrent with SR 50 (Williamsport Pike), before continuing east through a couple of neighborhoods before coming to an intersection with James Campbell Boulevard, where SR 50 splits off and goes southeast. US 412 Bus/SR 99 continue east through several neighborhoods, where they have an intersection with SR 243 (Trotwood Avenue) before entering downtown and coming to an intersection and turning north to become concurrent with US 31/SR 7 (North Garden Street). They continue north through downtown to an intersection with North James Campbell Boulevard, where SR 7 splits off and goes north. They then cross a bridge over the Duck River to leave downtown and widen to a 4-lane divided highway, where it passes through a major business district before coming to another intersection with US 43/US 412/SR 6, where US 412 Bus ends, US 43/SR 6 turn north on US 31, and SR 99 turns right to become concurrent as they turns and go through another business district. US 412/SR 99 then narrows to 2-lanes and continues east to leave the city, though it is still within the city limits, and go through farmland to eventually come to an interchange with I-65 (Exit 46), where US 412 ends and SR 99 becomes signed as a primary highway as it leaves Columbia and continues east. The highway passes through farmland and has short concurrency with US 431/SR 106 before crossing into Marshall County.

Marshall County

SR 99 continues east through farmland, where it has an intersection with SR 272, to come to an intersection with US 31A/SR 11, where it turns secondary and becomes concurrent with that highway shortly before having an intersection SR 270. The highway then continues north past several homes and businesses before passing straight through downtown Chapel Hill, after which SR 99 splits off from US 31A/SR 11 and goes east, leaving Chapel Hill. The highway then curves northeastward and crosses into Rutherford County shortly afterwards.

Rutherford County

SR 99 continues northeast to enter Eagleville at a Y-Intersection with US 41A/SR 16, which it becomes concurrent with for a short distance splitting off and going east on a new bypass of downtown and becoming concurrent with SR 269 before leaving Eagleville and continuing east through farmland, with SR 269 splitting off just south of Rockvale. SR 99 then passes through Rockvale before entering Murfreesboro, where it passes through before eventually having an interchange with I-24 (Exit 80). SR 99 then comes to an intersection and becomes concurrent with SR 96 (Old Fort Parkway), where it becomes unsigned again as it passes through a major business district as a 4-lane divided highway to enter downtown and come to an intersection with US 41/US 70S/US 231/SR 1/SR 10, where SR 96 continues north along US 231/SR 10 (Memorial Boulevard) and SR 99 turns east along US 41/US 70S/US 231/SR 1/SR 10 (NW Broad Street) to pass through downtown, with US 231/SR 10 (South Church Street) splitting shortly afterwards. They then come to an intersection with Mercury Boulevard, where US 70S/SR 1 split off to the east and SR 2 begins concurrent with US 41/SR 99 (SE Broad Street). The highway then heads south for a short distance before SR 99 splits off at a Y-Intersection onto Bradyville Pike as a 2-lane road. SR 99 then passes through several neighborhoods before leaving Murfreesboro and continuing east through farmland and countryside before crossing into Cannon County.

Cannon County

SR 99 continues east through countryside and farmland before entering Bradyville and coming to an end just north of downtown at an intersection with SR 64 (Bradyville Road).

Counties Traversed

History

Major intersections

References

External links
 

099
Transportation in Wayne County, Tennessee
Transportation in Lewis County, Tennessee
Transportation in Maury County, Tennessee
Transportation in Marshall County, Tennessee
Transportation in Rutherford County, Tennessee
Transportation in Cannon County, Tennessee